Agesander (or Agesandros or Hagesander or Hagesandros or Hegesander) can refer to more than one thing: 

Agesander of Rhodes, one or several sculptors who lived between about 70 BC and 70 AD, and signed "Laocoön and his Sons" in the Vatican Museums and the sculptures at Sperlonga
Agesander (Hades), an epithet of the Greek god Hades
Hegesander (historian) from Delphi
Agesander (grasshopper), a genus of insects

See also
Hegesandridas